The 2013–14 HC Slovan Bratislava season was the 2nd season for Bratislava based club in Kontinental Hockey League.

Schedule and results

Preseason and friendly games
Pre-season took part in July, August and September with 3 friendly matches and participating European Trophy. The training session started on 11 July 2013. In addition, Slovan played two friendly games against Kometa Brno during the olympic break.

|-bgcolor=ddffdd
|1||25 July|| Slavia Praha||1 – 2||Slovan Bratislava||Eden||1,124||
|-bgcolor=ddffdd
|2||1 August||Slovan Bratislava||2 – 0||Spartak Moscow ||Slovnaft Arena||10,055||
|-bgcolor=d0e7ff
|3||8 August||Slovan Bratislava||2 – 1 OT||Torpedo Nizhny Novgorod ||Slovnaft Arena||10,055||
|-

|-bgcolor=ddffdd
|1||9 August||Slovan Bratislava||6 – 2||Vienna Capitals ||Slovnaft Arena||7,616||1–0–0–0||
|-bgcolor=ffeeaa
|2||13 August|| Sparta Praha||3 – 2 SO||Slovan Bratislava||Slovnaft Arena||10,055||1–0–1–0||
|-bgcolor=ddffdd
|3||15 August||Slovan Bratislava||5 – 3 ||Piráti Chomutov ||Slovnaft Arena||9,945||2–0–1–0||
|-bgcolor=ffbbbb
|4||17 August|| Vienna Capitals||4 – 1||Slovan Bratislava||Albert-Schultz Eishalle||3,130||2–0–1–1||
|-bgcolor=ddffdd
|5||23 August|| JYP Jyväskylä||3 – 4||Slovan Bratislava||Synergia-areena||2,682||3–0–1–1||
|-bgcolor=ffbbbb
|6||24 August|| KalPa||4 – 2||Slovan Bratislava||Trust Kapital Areena||2,099||3–0–1–2||
|-bgcolor=ddffdd
|7||30 August||Slovan Bratislava||4 – 2||Linköpings ||Hant Aréna||1,875||4–0–1–2||
|-bgcolor=ddffdd
|8||1 September||Slovan Bratislava||7 – 4||HV71 ||Easton Arena||2,167||5–0–1–2||
|-

|-bgcolor=ffeeaa
|1||14 February||Slovan Bratislava||2 – 3 SO||Kometa Brno ||Slovnaft Arena||3,076||
|-bgcolor=#d0e7ff
|2||20 February|| Kometa Brno||2 – 3 SO||Slovan Bratislava||Kajot Arena||4,798|| 
|-

|-
| align="center"|

Notes

Regular season

|-bgcolor=ffbbbb
|1||6|| Donbass Donetsk||4 – 2|| Slovan Bratislava||Druzhba Arena||3,756||0–0–0–1|| 
|-bgcolor=ffbbbb
|2||8||Spartak Moscow||5 – 0 ||Slovan Bratislava||LDS Sokolniki||2,931||0–0–0–2||
|-bgcolor=ffbbbb
|3||10|| Dinamo Minsk||2 – 0||Slovan Bratislava||Minsk-Arena||8,460||0–0–0–3||
|-bgcolor=d0e7ff
|4||13|| Medveščak Zagreb||3 – 4 OT||Slovan Bratislava||Dom Sportova||6,500||0–1–0–3 || 
|-bgcolor=ffbbbb
|5||17||Slovan Bratislava||0 – 3||Torpedo Nizhny Novgorod||Slovnaft Arena||10,055||0–1–0–4||
|-bgcolor=ffbbbb
|6||19||Slovan Bratislava||1 – 4||Vityaz Podolsk||Slovnaft Arena||10,055||0–1–0–5||
|-bgcolor=d0e7ff
|7||21||Slovan Bratislava||2 – 1 OT||Ak Bars Kazan||Slovnaft Arena||9,702||0–2–0–5||
|-bgcolor=ffbbbb
|8||23||Slovan Bratislava||4 – 5||Dynamo Moscow||Slovnaft Arena||10,055||0–2–0–6||
|-bgcolor=ffbbbb
|9||27||Sibir Novosibirsk||3 – 1||Slovan Bratislava||Ice Sports Palace Sibir||6,000||0–2–0–7||
|-bgcolor=ddffdd
|10||29||Metallurg Novokuznetsk||1 – 3||Slovan Bratislava||Sports Palace||3,275||1–2–0–7||
|-

|-bgcolor=ddffdd
|11||1||Amur Khabarovsk||2 – 5|| Slovan Bratislava||Platinum Arena||7,000||2–2–0–7||
|-bgcolor=ffbbbb
|12||3||Admiral Vladivostok||3 – 1||Slovan Bratislava||Fetisov Arena||5,500||2–2–0–8||
|-bgcolor=d0e7ff
|13||9||Slovan Bratislava||4 – 3 OT||Metallurg Magnitogorsk||Slovnaft Arena||9,605||2–3–0–8||
|-bgcolor=d0e7ff
|14||11||Slovan Bratislava||2 – 1 SO||Salavat Yulaev Ufa||Slovnaft Arena||10,055||2–4–0–8||
|-bgcolor=ddffdd
|15||13||Slovan Bratislava||6 – 5||Traktor Chelyabinsk||Slovnaft Arena||10,055||3–4–0–8||
|-bgcolor=ddffdd
|16||15||Slovan Bratislava||5 – 2||Lev Praha ||Slovnaft Arena||10,055||4–4–0–8||
|-bgcolor=ffbbbb
|17||17||Slovan Bratislava||3 – 4||Dinamo Riga ||Slovnaft Arena ||10,055||4–4–0–9||
|-bgcolor=ffbbbb
|18||21||Slovan Bratislava||2 – 3 ||CSKA Moscow||Slovnaft Arena ||10,055||4–4–0–10||
|-bgcolor=ffbbbb
|19||26||Severstal Cherepovets||2 – 0||Slovan Bratislava||Ice Palace||4,250||4–4–0–11||
|-bgcolor=ffbbbb
|20||28||Lokomotiv Yaroslavl||2 – 1||Slovan Bratislava||Arena 2000||7,716||4–4–0–12||
|-bgcolor=ddffdd
|21||30||Atlant Mytishchi||0 – 1||Slovan Bratislava||Mytishchi Arena||5,200||5–4–0–12||
|-

|-bgcolor=ffbbbb
|22||1||SKA Saint Petersburg||4 – 2|| Slovan Bratislava||Ice Palace||12,300||5–4–0–13||
|-bgcolor=d0e7ff
|23||13||Slovan Bratislava||3 – 2 SO||Yugra Khanty-Mansiysk||Slovnaft Arena||9,731||5–5–0–13||
|-bgcolor=ddffdd
|24||15||Slovan Bratislava||3 – 1||Avtomobilist Yekaterinburg||Slovnaft Arena||10,055||6–5–0–13||
|-bgcolor=ffbbbb
|25||17||Slovan Bratislava||2 – 6||Barys Astana ||Slovnaft Arena||10,055||6–5–0–14||
|-bgcolor=ddffdd
|26||19||Slovan Bratislava||3 – 1||Avangard Omsk||Slovnaft Arena||10,055||7–5–0–14||
|-bgcolor=d0e7ff
|27||22||Yugra Khanty-Mansiysk||0 – 1 SO||Slovan Bratislava||Arena Ugra||2,600||7–6–0–14||
|-bgcolor=ffbbbb
|28||24||Avtomobilist Yekaterinburg||8 – 1||Slovan Bratislava||KRK Uralets||5,500||7–6–0–15||
|-bgcolor=ffbbbb
|29||26|| Barys Astana||6 – 1||Slovan Bratislava||Kazakhstan Sports Palace||4,002||7–6–0–16||
|-bgcolor=ffbbbb
|30||28||Avangard Omsk||4 – 2||Slovan Bratislava||Omsk Arena||6,780||7–6–0–17||
|-

|-bgcolor=ddffdd
|31||2||Slovan Bratislava||3 – 2|| Severstal Cherepovets||Slovnaft Arena||10,055||8–6–0–17||
|-bgcolor=ffeeaa
|32||4||Slovan Bratislava||2 – 3 SO||SKA Saint Petersburg||Slovnaft Arena||10,055||8–6–1–17||
|-bgcolor=ddffdd
|33||8||Slovan Bratislava||5 – 3||Lokomotiv Yaroslavl||Slovnaft Arena||10,055||9–6–1–17||
|-bgcolor=ffeeaa
|34||9||Slovan Bratislava||1 – 2 SO||Atlant Mytishchi||Slovnaft Arena||10,055||9–6–2–17||
|-bgcolor=ddffdd
|35||13||CSKA Moscow||4 – 5||Slovan Bratislava||CSKA Ice Palace||3,247||10–6–2–17||
|-bgcolor=ffbbbb
|36||15|| Lev Praha||7 – 0||Slovan Bratislava||Tipsport Arena||12,864||10–6–2–18||
|-bgcolor=ddffdd
|37||27||Slovan Bratislava||4 – 2||Neftekhimik Nizhnekamsk||Slovnaft Arena||10,055||11–6–2–18||
|-bgcolor=ddffdd
|38||29|| Dinamo Riga||1 – 3||Slovan Bratislava||Arena Riga||10,100||12–6–2–18||
|-

|-bgcolor=ffbbbb
|39||3||Metallurg Magnitogorsk||6 – 2||Slovan Bratislava||Magnitogorsk Arena||7,500||12–6–2–19||
|-bgcolor=ffbbbb
|40||5||Traktor Chelyabinsk||2 – 1||Slovan Bratislava||Traktor Sport Palace||7,000||12–6–2–20||
|-bgcolor=ffeeaa
|41||7||Neftekhimik Nizhnekamsk||4 – 3 OT||Slovan Bratislava||SCC Arena||4,000||12–6–3–20||
|-bgcolor=ffbbbb
|42||9||Salavat Yulaev Ufa||4 – 2||Slovan Bratislava||Ufa Arena||7,710||12–6–3–21||
|-bgcolor=d0e7ff
|43||13||Slovan Bratislava||2 – 1 SO||Sibir Novosibirsk||Slovnaft Arena||10,055||12–7–3–21||
|-bgcolor=ddffdd
|44||15||Slovan Bratislava||3 – 2||Amur Khabarovsk||Slovnaft Arena||10,055||13–7–3–21||
|-bgcolor=ffbbbb
|45||17||Slovan Bratislava||1 – 6||Admiral Vladivostok||Slovnaft Arena||10,055||13–7–3–22||
|-bgcolor=ffbbbb
|46||19||Slovan Bratislava||2 – 3||Metallurg Novokuznetsk||Slovnaft Arena||10,055||13–7–3–23||
|-bgcolor=ffeeaa
|47||22||Ak Bars Kazan||2 – 1 SO||Slovan Bratislava||TatNeft Arena||3,639||13–7–4–23||
|-bgcolor=ddffdd
|48||24||Torpedo Nizhny Novgorod||2 – 3||Slovan Bratislava||Trade Union Sport Palace||5,500||14–7–4–23||
|-bgcolor=d0e7ff
|49||26||Vityaz Podolsk||1 – 2 SO||Slovan Bratislava||Podolsk Hero Arena||4,600||14–8–4–23||
|-bgcolor=ddffdd
|50||28||Dynamo Moscow||2 – 3||Slovan Bratislava||Minor Arena||5,256||15–8–4–23||
|-

|-bgcolor=d0e7ff
|51||26||Slovan Bratislava||4 – 3 SO||Dinamo Minsk ||Slovnaft Arena||10,055||15–9–4–23||
|-bgcolor=ffbbbb
|52||28||Slovan Bratislava||1 – 2||Donbass Donetsk ||Slovnaft Arena||10,055||15–9–4–24||
|-

|-bgcolor=ffbbbb
|53||2||Slovan Bratislava||0 – 3||Spartak Moscow||Slovnaft Arena||10,055||15–9–4–25||
|-bgcolor=ffbbbb
|54||4||Slovan Bratislava||2 – 3 ||Medveščak Zagreb ||Slovnaft Arena||10,055||15–9–4–26||
|-

|-
| align="center"|

Notes

Nadezhda Cup
Nadezhda Cup is a post-season tournament for teams that did not qualify for the Play-offs. In the qualification round, the teams play a series of two games with the possibility of a tie. In case of a tie after the two games, a short Overtime and penalty shootout will follow.

|-  style="text-align:center; background:#cfc;"
|-bgcolor= ffbbbb
|1 || 7 March ||  Dinamo Minsk ||  1 – 0 || Slovan Bratislava || Babruysk Arena ||5,000  || 0–0–1 ||
|-bgcolor= ffbbbb
|2 || 10 March || Slovan Bratislava  || 1 – 2 ||   Dinamo Minsk || Slovnaft Arena  || 6,085|| 0–0–2 ||
|-

|-
| align="center"|

Detailed records

Standings
Source: khl.ru
After games of 4 March 2014

Bobrov Division

Western Conference

*– Division leader;
BOB – Bobrov Division, TAR – Tarasov Division

Final roster
Source: hcslovan.sk
As of 10 March 2013

|}

Player statistics
Source: khl.ru
Updated as of 10 March 2013.

Skaters

Goaltenders

Milestones and team statistics

Team milestones

Team statistics
All statistics are for regular season only.

Notes

Source:

Player milestones

Source:

Roster changes

Transactions
Source: EuroHockey.com

Free agents signed

Free agents lost

Player signings
This is the list of all players that extended their contracts with HC Slovan Bratislava:

Players lost via retirement

Draft picks
Slovan's picks at the 2013 KHL Junior Draft in Donetsk, Ukraine.

Notes

See also
HC Slovan Bratislava all-time KHL record
List of HC Slovan Bratislava seasons

References

Bratislava
HC Slovan Bratislava seasons
Slovan Bratislava